Nadzieja may refer to:
 Nadzieja, Lublin Voivodeship
 Nadzieja, Masovian Voivodeship